Entocytheridae is a family of crustaceans belonging to the order Podocopida.

Genera

Genera:
 Aitkenicythere Bate, 1976
 Ankylocythere Hart, 1962
 Argentodromas Diaz & Martens, 2018

References

Podocopida